The 1931 Railway Cup Hurling Championship was the fifth series of the inter-provincial hurling Railway Cup. Two matches were played between 8 February and 17 March 1931. It was contested by Connacht, who returned after a three-year absence, Leinster and Munster.

Munster entered the championship as the defending champions.

On 17 March 1931, Munster won the Railway Cup after a 1–12 to 2–06 defeat of Leinster in the final at Croke Park, Dublin. This was their fourth title over all and their fourth title in succession.

Munster's Mick Ahern was the Railway Cup top scorer with 6-08.

Results

Semi-final

Final

Top scorers

Top scorers overall

Sources

 Donegan, Des, The Complete Handbook of Gaelic Games (DBA Publications Limited, 2005).

External links
 Munster Railway Cup-winning teams

Railway Cup Hurling Championship
Railway Cup Hurling Championship